Prostrate may refer to:-

Prostration, a position of submission in religion etc.
Prone position, a face-down orientation of the body
Prostrate shrub, a plant with a trailing habit